Australian athletes have increasingly been painted by street artists since 2000. This artwork is often in prominent locations and celebrates athlete achievements, sporting competitions and events and societal issues. The artworks are often commissioned by sports organisations or sponsors.

Street art is often not permanent and many of the artworks in this list many no longer exist at the location specified.

References

Street art in Australia
Sports culture in Australia
Lists of public art in Australia
Sports in art